A bandersnatch is a fictional creature in Lewis Carroll's 1871 novel Through the Looking-Glass and his 1874 poem The Hunting of the Snark. Although neither work describes the appearance of a bandersnatch in great detail, in The Hunting of the Snark, it has a long neck and snapping jaws, and both works describe it as ferocious and extraordinarily fast. Through the Looking-Glass implies that bandersnatches may be found in the world behind the looking-glass, and in The Hunting of the Snark, a bandersnatch is found by a party of adventurers after crossing an ocean. Bandersnatches have appeared in various adaptations of Carroll's works; they have also been used in other authors' works and in other forms of media.

Description
Carroll's first mention of a Bandersnatch, in the poem "Jabberwocky" (which appears in Through the Looking-Glass), is very brief: the narrator of the poem admonishes his son to "shun / The frumious Bandersnatch", the name describing the creature's fuming and furious character. Later in the novel, the White King says of his wife (the White Queen): "She runs so fearfully quick. You might as well try to catch a Bandersnatch!"

In "The Hunting of the Snark," while the party searches for the Snark, the Banker runs ahead and encounters a Bandersnatch:
And the Banker, inspired with a courage so new 
It was matter for general remark, 
Rushed madly ahead and was lost to their view
In his zeal to discover the Snark.

But while he was seeking with thimbles and care, 
A Bandersnatch swiftly drew nigh 
And grabbed at the Banker, who shrieked in despair,
For he knew it was useless to fly.

He offered large discount — he offered a cheque
(Drawn "to bearer") for seven-pounds-ten: 
But the Bandersnatch merely extended its neck 
And grabbed at the Banker again.

Without rest or pause — while those frumious jaws 
Went savagely snapping around —
He skipped and he hopped, and he floundered and flopped, 
Till fainting he fell to the ground.

The Bandersnatch fled as the others appeared
Led on by that fear-stricken yell: 
And the Bellman remarked "It is just as I feared!" 
And solemnly tolled on his bell.

In other media

Literature
 Anna Matlack Richards's A New Alice in the Old Wonderland (1895) contains a broader description given of the Bandersnatch within the poem Bandersnatchy. In this poem, another hero sets out to slay the frumious Bandersnatch so as to gain respect from his people against the hero who slew the Jabberwock (a story he would sit and tell till after ten o'clock). The author writes that it is necessary to be armed with a vorpal sword or a  pistol, because one never can tell what a Bandersnatch might do. The hero describes the creature as being extremely long-legged with a long tail and the ability to fly. It could be understood that the Bandersnatch perhaps camouflages itself as a tree. There is an illustration by the author's daughter, Anna Richards Brewster, of the hero's encounter with the Bandersnatch.
 In a letter from 1959, C. S. Lewis wrote, "No one ever influenced Tolkien – you might as well try to influence a bandersnatch."
 In Larry Niven's Known Space series (1965 to present), there is a heavy-gravity species somewhat resembling a giant slug; upon their discovery they were immediately given the genus and species "Frumious bandersnatch."
 In Roger Zelazny’s (1987) Sign of Chaos (part of Chronicles of Amber) the protagonist encounters a Bandersnatch.  The creature is described as segmented, with a side-to-side gait, leaving a trail of steaming saliva, and hissing like a leaky pressure cooker. The Bandersnatch suffered a heart-attack after having a cardiac arrest spell cast on it, implying that its general anatomy is analogous to normal animals. The episode takes place in a reality created by the mind of one of the characters while under the influence of a hallucinogenic drug.
 In Wilfrid Blunt's 1966 novel Omar, the character Omar is a hyrax who speaks English and certain dialects of horses and rhinoceroses. Omar claims that the word bandersnatch refers to hyraxes, and that the warning to "shun a bandersnatch" only pertains if it happens to be frumious.
 The Frumious Bandersnatch is the title of a 2003 police procedural novel by Ed McBain, one of the last in his 87th Precinct series of detective crime fiction.
 In Eric Nylund's 2006 novel Ghosts of Onyx, the code-name 'Bandersnatch' is used to warn UNSC troops for a radiological or energy-based disaster. It was previously used on occasions where Covenant troops had 'glassed' former human colonies.

Television and film
 In Pandora Hearts (2006), Lily's chain is a large black dog named Bandersnatch.
 In the Young Justice episode "Earthling," Adam Strange improvises a performance of the second verse of Jabberwocky in order to distract a patrol while on the planet Rann. "Beware the Jabberwock, my son! The jaws that bite, the claws that catch! Beware the Jubjub bird, and shun The frumious Bandersnatch!" He soon scurries away saying "No time to say hello, goodbye! I'm late! I'm late! I'm late!" "... and down the rabbit hole I go!" Strange's mission accomplices include a pet from his alien hosts' household with an appearance not unlike some illustrations of a Jubjub bird.
 In the 2010 film Alice in Wonderland, the Bandersnatch appears as a large white beast somewhat resembling a mix of bulldog, snow leopard and bear with long fur, black spots, a long tail, and multiple rows of sharp teeth. It is a creature under the control of the Red Queen until Alice returns its eye (which it had lost to the Dormouse). It helps Alice to escape and joins the White Queen's forces. In the video game adaptation of the film, it serves a similar role.
 The Bandersnatch appears in the Once Upon a Time in Wonderland episode "Forget-Me-Not." This version is a monstrous wild boar. In the past, Alice had faced the Bandersnatch before. In the present, Jafar and the Red Queen send the female Bandersnatch after Alice and the Knave of Hearts in order to get Alice to use up one of her wishes from Cyrus. Jafar gives the Bandersnatch the magic message response that Alice made for Cyrus so that it can pick up her scent. The Bandersnatch tracks Alice to the Grendel's house and attacks where it knocks out the Grendel. As Alice restrains the Bandersnatch, the Knave of Hearts stabs it. The Red Queen states to Jafar that the Bandersnatch mates for life and that the male Bandersnatch in their possession is now dead.
 In the adult animated movie Mardock Scramble: The First Compression (2010), a dockside warehouse owned by the livestock export company "Bander Snatch" is used as a clandestine meeting location (visible at 45:34).
In Date A Live season 2, the robotic creatures of Deus Ex Machina are called the Bandersnatch.
In the television series Once Upon a Time, the Bandersnatch is mentioned by Alice in the episode "The Girl in the Tower" as a reference to Alice's speed: "I once outran a Bandersnatch."
 Black Mirror: Bandersnatch is a standalone interactive film released in between the fourth and fifth seasons of the Netflix anthology series Black Mirror.

Music
 San Francisco psychedelic rock band Frumious Bandersnatch named themselves after Carroll's work.
 Seattle rock band Forgive Durden released a single entitled "Beware the Jubjub Bird and Shun the frumious Bandersnatch!" (2006) from the album Wonderland.
 An all-male a capella group at Skidmore College named themselves the Bandersnatchers ("Banders" for short)
 Dutch composer Theo Verbey wrote a piece called Bandersnatch for cello and pianola, which was premiered during the 2010 Amsterdam Cello Biennale.

Comics
 In the 2010 graphic novel Calamity Jack, sequel to Rapunzel's Revenge (published in 2006), the giant Blunderboar has a pet Bandersnatch named Lewis, presumably after Lewis Carroll. This Bandersnatch appears as a giant toadlike being with a massive mouth, two small mouths in place of eyes, a long froglike tongue, and the ability to spit acid. It was killed when the Jabblewocky bit it.
 In the visual novel Sekien no Inganock - What a Beautiful People, Bandersnatch appears as a fantastic Creature that manifests itself inside the "engine space" within the City's computer network and preys upon hackers who access the virtual reality.
 In Ursula Vernon's webcomic Digger, a bandersnatch appears as a two-headed, sentient, exiled draft animal.
 In the online comic Skin Deep, the Bandersnatch is shown to be a harmless creature.

Games
 Bandersnatch, a 1984 vaporware game project by Imagine Software that led to the 1986 game Brataccas.
 Bandersnatch, a name used many times in the Final Fantasy video game series (1987–present). The name is given to various enemies in many installments of the game in both the Japanese and English-language versions. In most of the games, it is a common enemy that does not create much difficulty for the player, and it usually has qualities of wolves or lions in appearance. In Final Fantasy IX, however, the Bandersnatch is a slightly stronger enemy with a strange appearance that seems to be a large, demonic poodle with an expansive toothy grin. It is summoned by the antagonists during an important story scene in the game. The Bandersnatch of Final Fantasy XV is a major enemy, an enormous bipedal reptile vaguely resembling a Tyrannosaurus, its body covered in brutal, jagged spines, and an unusual mouth with two massive vertical jaws and rows of man-sized fangs.
 In the massively multiplayer online role-playing games Mabinogi (2004) and LaTale (2006), the Bandersnatch makes an appearance. In Mabinogi, a Bandersnatch is an ice monster located in "Par Dungeon". A normal Bandersnatch can only be killed with one of the fire spells, or a giant's stomp ability, due to their high defense. The Giant Bandersnatch can be killed as a normal monster and is the boss of the dungeon. Both normal and Giant Bandersnatches move slowly and will not normally attack unless first hit is activated. In Latale, the Bandersnatch is a dog-like creature with strange markings and a massive jaw. It is an auto-aggressive monster that either lunges at the player or headbutts when its close to the player. It can be found in the first two rooms of the Treasure Vault Instance or King's Room.
 Bandersnatches are a powerful type of enemy in Kingdom Rush: Origins, appearing as a large, blue and purple monster with a spiny back and the ability to roll into a ball and move extraordinarily quickly.
 In the Shadowrun universe, bandersnatches are humanoid creatures whose bodies can refract light. They can blend in almost perfectly with their surroundings, making them difficult to see, even with the use of thermal detectors, since the radiation of their body heat is also masked. They can usually be found in the Salish-Sidhe wilderness, sometimes in abandoned buildings, and tend to attack in small groups.
Bandersnatch is the name of an enemy in Resident Evil – Code: Veronica. It shares nothing in common with the source material other than an extendable arm, giving it the 'long reach' of its namesake.
Frumious Bandersnatch is the name of a familiar in the browser-based multiplayer online role-playing game Kingdom of Loathing, obtained by buying a special monthly item in March 2009.
 In the Tera universe, Bandersnatch is a name given to the last boss in Wonderholme'''s dungeon.
 In the Pathfinder Roleplaying Game, the bandersnatch, along with the Jub-Jub Bird and Jabberwock, is one of a group of monsters called The Tane invented by the fey lords as living weapons.

Computer science
 Bandersnatches are the subject of a difficult algorithm design project for an apparently NP-complete problem in the academic theoretical computer science book by M. R. Garey and D. S. Johnson, Computers and Intractability: A Guide to the Theory of NP-Completeness''.

Physical locations
 In Ashland, OR, USA there is a hiking trail above Lithia Park named Bandersnatch Trail.
 Denison University in Granville, OH, USA has a student-run cafe called The Bandersnatch.
 Previously a student-run cafe at the University of Chicago (circa late 1960s-early 1970s).

References

Lewis Carroll characters
Fantasy creatures
Literary characters introduced in 1871
Jabberwocky